Salix pantosericea is a species of willow first described by Görz in 1934 from the Caucasus region.

References 

argophylla